The 1944 All-Pro Team consisted of American football players who were chosen by various selectors for the All-Pro team for the 1944 football season. Teams were selected by, among others, the Associated Press (AP), the United Press (UP), the International News Service (INS), Pro Football Illustrated, and the New York Daily News (NYDN).

Selections

References

All-Pro Teams
1944 National Football League season